Jeffrey Alan Roehl (born May 18, 1980) is a dance music DJ and producer based in Chicago, known by his stage name Xonic. In 2003, he was an American football offensive lineman for the New York Giants of the National Football League.

Producer/DJ Xonic

From his press bio: Northwestern grad / former NFL player reborn as Chicago-based producer/DJ Xonic. Xonic is a 2013/2014 Spring Awakening Fest (main stage), 2013 North Coast Fest, and 2013 Wavefront Fest artist and a current resident at the Century Room/the Mid, Vertigo Sky Lounge & Lunatics of Bam.

Xonic's skills on the decks and in the studio have led him to be chosen to support and/or share a bill with top acts such as: Alesso, Afrojack, Krewella, 3LAU, Sidney Samson, Porter Robinson, Nervo, Hardwell, R3hab, Zedd, The Chainsmokers, Cash Cash, Hard Rock Sofa, Mord Fustang, Uberjakd, Autoerotique, Zebo, Inphinity, Kalendr, Tony Arzadon, Milk N Cookies, Shermanology, Jordan V, Trentino, Stellar, Orville Kline, Midnight Conspiracy, Dante, Steve Smooth, D2A, Positive Vibr8tions, & Swggrbck.

Performance resume encompasses the top-tier of Chicago nightlife (the Mid, Spybar, Dolphin, Rooftop at the Wit, Sound-bar, Congress Theater, Bodi, Bull & Bear, Bevy, NV Penthouse, the Century Room at the Mid, Enclave, Prohibit, Red Ivy, Y Bar, Fedora Lounge, Stay, Proof, Vertigo Sky Lounge, Polekatz, and Estate Ultrabar.) He is a fixture in the statewide college scene with repeat performances at Illinois State & Northern Illinois. Xonic has taken his talents to the international level, performing multiple shows in Mexico City in 2012-13 and headlining Lukrezia in Acapulco for New Years 2014.

Additionally, Xonic performed at the 2012 Bass City Oasis Festival alongside Lazy Rich and Hatiras, and played the official Bassnectar afterparty at Illinois State University. He has performed on the road with Na Palm and headlined the 2012 MODA fashion show at Union Station.

High School Football Career
Jeff Roehl attended Carl Sandburg High School in Orland Park, Illinois.  In 1997, the Roehl-led Eagles set the school record for both total yards in a season and total rushing yards in a season.  Roehl was a two-year varsity starter and finished his career rated as the 98th best football prospect in the USA by Tom Lemming of the Prep Football Report.

College Football Career 
Roehl originally attended the University of Notre Dame in 1998 on a full football scholarship.  After one season at Notre Dame, he transferred to Northwestern University and sat out the 1999 season (due to NCAA transfer regulations).  Beginning the following season, he was named a starter at offensive guard and began a streak of 35 consecutive starts which continued through his final game of eligibility in the 2002 season.  The Northwestern Wildcats won the Big Ten Conference Championship and played in the Alamo Bowl in 2000 while he was a starter.  Prior to the 2002 season, Roehl was rated as the No. 12 guard in the nation by the Sporting News.  He was selected to play in the 2003 East-West Shrine Game in San Francisco, California.  Roehl played under the late Randy Walker at Northwestern and cites Walker as one of his heroes.  He graduated in 2003 with a degree in organizational communication with a minor in economics.

Professional Football Career
An undrafted free agent out of Northwestern University, Roehl signed with the New York Giants and entered the 2003 training camp as a long shot to make the team.  He outplayed several NFL veterans to earn a spot on the 53-man active roster at the start of the regular season.  Roehl saw his first game action in the first quarter of the first game, substituting for Luke Petitgout at left tackle and playing against Grant Wistrom of the St. Louis Rams.  He performed admirably and was named a starter for the Monday Night Football game vs. the Dallas Cowboys on September 15, 2003.  During the rest of the season, Roehl played in twelve games, starting one more.  During the 2003 season, Roehl was featured on "Hey Rookie, Welcome to the NFL", an ESPN documentary profiling the life of a few select NFL first-year players.

During the 2004 offseason, the Giants made a coaching change from Jim Fassel to Tom Coughlin.  This coaching change coincided with an untimely injury for Roehl, and as a result his career with the New York Giants was over.  Roehl went on to be claimed off the waiver wire by the Seattle Seahawks in 2004.  In 2005, he spent most of the year on the roster of the New England Patriots and in 2006, he was a full-time starter in NFL Europa for the Amsterdam Admirals.  After the 2006 NFL Europe season, Roehl briefly signed with the Philadelphia Eagles, and then spent some time out of football.  In late June 2009, Roehl signed with the Kentucky Horsemen of the Arena Football 2 League and was placed on the active roster in early July, starting at the offensive line position for the duration of the regular season and the playoffs.  In 2010, Roehl signed with the Chicago Rush of Arena Football 1.

Football Awards

High school
 1996 All Conference (SICA Blue)
 1996 All Area (Star Newspapers)
 1997 National Football Foundation Scholar-Athlete
 1997 IHSA Academic All-State
 1997 Conference MVP (SICA Blue)
 1997 All Conference (SICA Blue)
 1997 All Area (Star Newspapers, Chicago Sun-Times)
 1997 All State (H.S. Coaches, Chicago Tribune, Champaign News-Gazette)
 1997 "Best of the Midwest" Team (Detroit Free Press)
 1997 Third-team All America (Prep Football Report)

College
 2000 Honorable Mention All America (Football News)
 2000 Mid-Season All America (CNN/SI)
 2000 Honorable Mention All Big Ten
 2000 Academic All Big Ten
 2000 Offensive Newcomer of the Year (NGN)
 2001 Honorable Mention All Big Ten
 2001 Academic All Big Ten
 2001 Rashidi Wheeler Award
 2002 2nd Team All Big Ten
 2002 Academic All Big Ten
 2002 Academic All District
 2002 Carnig Minisian Citizenship Award

Professional
 2006 First-team All-NFL Europe (Amsterdam Admirals)

References

External links
 Official Northwestern University Bio

1980 births
American football offensive linemen
Amsterdam Admirals players
Living people
New York Giants players
Notre Dame Fighting Irish football players
Northwestern Wildcats football players
People from West New York, New Jersey
Kentucky Horsemen players
Chicago Rush players